Las Aguas is a station on the TransMilenio mass-transit system of Bogotá, Colombia.

Location
The station is located in the eastern part of downtown Bogotá, specifically on the Avenida Jiménez extension, Carrera 3 with Calles 18 and 19.

History
The Eje Ambiental line of the TransMilenio was opened in 2002, which include Museo del Oro, Avenida Jiménez, and this station.

The station is named Aguas due to the church and neighborhood of the same name located in the area.

This station has a "Punto de Encuentro" or point of gathering, which has bathrooms, coffeeshop, parking for bicycles and a tourist attention booth.

Station Services

Old trunk services

Main line service

Note: the station does not provide service on Sundays and holidays.

Complementary routes
The following complementary route also works:
  Circular Germania - Carrera Séptima - Tibabitá (Usaquén).

Inter-city service
This station does not have inter-city service.

See also
 Bogotá
 TransMilenio
 List of TransMilenio Stations

External links

 TransMilenio

TransMilenio